The Scotland national football team is the joint-oldest international football team, having played in the first official international match, a goalless draw on 30 November 1872 against England. Since then, the team has established a long-standing rivalry with England, particularly in the annual British Home Championship, which Scotland won 24 times outright and shared a further 17 times. The team has enjoyed less success in continental and global competition. Even though Scotland has participated in eight FIFA World Cup and three UEFA European Championship final tournaments, the team has never progressed beyond the first round of any major tournament.

Kenny Dalglish, the only man to have won more than 100 caps for Scotland, was the only Scottish player named in the FIFA 100. Denis Law, who shares with Dalglish the record for the most goals scored for the national team, is the only Scottish player to have won the European Footballer of the Year award. The Scottish Football Association maintains a roll of honour for players who have won at least 50 caps. This distinction was launched in March 1998, when 11 players had already achieved that mark.

This list includes all Scotland players who have made one appearance for the national team.

List of players

Key

See also
List of Scotland international footballers (2–3 caps)
List of Scotland international footballers (4–9 caps)
List of Scotland international footballers (10+ caps)
Scotland national football team roll of honour (50+ caps)

Footnotes

References

External links
 Scottish FA Archive
 List of Players at Londonhearts.com

 
Association football player non-biographical articles